The Office on Missing Persons (OMP)' is a Sri Lankan government department tasked with bringing closure to suffering victims and their relatives by determining the status of all missing persons in Sri Lanka. It is the first pillar of four "Transitional Justice mechanisms" proposed by the Sirisena–Wickremesinghe administration in the aftermath of the Sri Lankan Civil War. The Office On Missing Persons (Establishment, Administration And Discharge Of Functions) Act, No. 14 of 2016 provides for:

Anywhere between 16,000 and 20,000 people are thought to be missing in Sri Lanka.

Background

After the end of the Sri Lankan Civil War, recommendations of the Lessons Learnt and Reconciliation Commission (LLRC) (December 2011), included investigations into the disappearances and abductions of persons to ensure accountability and responsibility on them. The Presidential Commission of Inquiry Into Complaints of Abductions and Disappearances (August 2015), also known as the Paranagama Commission, after its head Maxwell Paranagama, investigating missing persons Sri Lanka, found close to 19,000 persons confirmed to have gone missing during the Sri Lankan Civil War. 23,586 complaints were received including approximately 5,000 from families of security forces personals. A United Nations Working Group on Enforced or Involuntary Disappearances, during the period from 1980 to 2010 related to the 1987–1989 JVP insurrection and Sri Lankan Civil War, recorded 12,000 cases of enforced disappearances.

History
The government first introduced a bill to establish the Office on Missing Persons (OMP) on the 22 May 2016. The Office was established 15 September 2017, and operations commenced on 28 February 2018 with the appointment of members to the commission. The office's first step will be to investigate missing persons in conflict affected areas of the North and East of the country including victims, civilians and members of the armed forces and the police. As of March 2018 13,294 completed applications (Feedback Data Sheet) have been submitted island-wide. A database has also been developed to maintain records of missing persons.

Operations

Scope
In the context of the office, a missing person is defined as "one whose fate or whereabouts are reasonably believed to be unknown". Such as the following:

1. "in the course of, consequent to, or in connection with the conflict which took place in the Northern and Eastern Provinces or its aftermath, or is a member of the armed forces or police who is identified as “missing in action”; or
2. in connection with political unrest or civil disturbances (such as the youth insurrections of 1971 or 1987–1989 JVP insurrection); or
3. as an enforced disappearance as defined in the “International Convention for the Protection of All Persons from Enforced Disappearance”;"

This definition applies to all people in all regions of Sri Lanka regardless of ethnicity or religion.

Commission
2018-2021
There are 7 members of the commission who are appointed for a term of 3 years. Each member can only serve a maximum of two terms. All commissioners are nominated and approved by the Constitutional Council and are appointed by the president. The commissioners are to not only be qualified professionals on human rights, humanitarian Laws and with investigative skills but also representative of the Sri Lankan society as a whole.

Mandate
The Office on Missing Persons is not law enforcement or Judicial agency, but a truth and investigative one. The findings of the OMP will not give rise to any criminal or civil liability. The commission has the power to recommend compensation and to clear the way for next of kin to take legal action against those responsible for the disappearance of their loved ones. According to Part II Section 10 of the Office on Missing Persons Act, No. 14 of 2016, the office was established:

The OMP had a budget of Rs 1.3 Billion (2018).

See also
 Sri Lanka and state terrorism
 Human rights in Sri Lanka
 Alleged war crimes during the final stages of the Sri Lankan Civil War

References

Citations

Bibliography

External links
 Secretariat for Coordinating Reconciliation Mechanisms - Office of Missing Persons
 Paranagama Report

1971 JVP insurrection
1987–1989 JVP insurrection
2017 establishments in Sri Lanka
 
Government agencies established in 2017
Government agencies of Sri Lanka
Missing people organizations
People of the Sri Lankan Civil War
Unsolved crimes in Sri Lanka